The Adelaide Jets Water Polo Club is an Australian club water polo team that competes in the National Water Polo League.  They have a men's team and a women's team and are based in Adelaide.

Players
Men's 2013

References

External links
 
 

Water polo clubs in Australia
Sporting clubs in Adelaide